Betty Blokk-buster Follies is a 1976 Australian film based on Reg Livermore's popular one man show of the same period.

Characters include:
Betty Blokk-buster, a German maid who entertained the troops during the war;
an old man who recalls his youth as a male model
Vaseline Amyl Nitrate, a football star who joins the Australian ballet.

It was shot in the Bijou Theatre, Balmain, in late 1975.

Soundtrack

Track listing
LP/Cassette

Soundtrack chart

Release history

References

External links

Betty Blokk-buster Follies at Oz Movies

1976 films
Films shot in Australia
Films set in Australia
Australian films based on plays
Australian musical comedy films
1970s English-language films
1970s Australian films